Babu Parmanand (10 August 1932 – 24 April 2008 in Jammu) was an Indian politician and the governor of Haryana from 19 June 1999 to 2 July 2004. He was born in Sarore village of the present-day Samba district in Jammu and Kashmir state (now a union territory). In 1962, he was elected for the first time to the Jammu and Kashmir Legislative Assembly from Ramgarh constituency. He was the speaker of the Jammu and Kashmir Legislative Assembly in 1980.
He has a son, Dr. Rajendra Prasad, who is a doctor in AIIMS hospital.

References

People from Jammu and Kashmir
Governors of Haryana
1932 births
2008 deaths
Speakers of the Jammu and Kashmir Legislative Assembly
People from Samba district
People from Jammu (city)
Jammu and Kashmir MLAs 1962–1967
Jammu and Kashmir MLAs 1977–1983